West Germany (Federal Republic of Germany) competed at the 1976 Summer Olympics in Montreal, Quebec, Canada. 290 competitors, 233 men and 57 women, took part in 163 events in 20 sports.

Medalists
West Germany finished in fourth position in the final medal rankings, with 10 gold medals and 39 medals overall.

Gold
 Annegret Richter — Athletics, Women's 100 metres
 Gregor Braun — Cycling, Men's 4000m Individual Pursuit 
 Gregor Braun, Hans Lutz, Günther Schumacher, and Peter Vonhof — Cycling, Men's 4000m Team Pursuit 
 Alwin Schockemöhle — Equestrian, Jumping Individual
 Harry Boldt, Gabriela Grillo, and Reiner Klimke — Equestrian, Dressage Team 
 Thomas Bach, Matthias Behr, Harald Hein, Klaus Reichert, and Erik Sens-Gorius — Fencing, Foil Team 
 Alexander Pusch — Fencing, Épée Individual 
 Karl-Heinz Smieszek — Shooting, Men's Small-bore Rifle prone 
 Eckart Diesch and Jörg Diesch — Sailing, Men's Flying Dutchman 
 Harro Bode and Frank Hübner — Sailing, Men's 470

Silver
 Guido Kratschmer — Athletics, Men's Decathlon
 Annegret Richter — Athletics, Women's 200 metres
 Inge Helten, Annegret Kroniger, Elvira Poßekel, and Annegret Richter — Athletics, Women's 4 × 100 m Relay
 Marion Becker — Athletics, Women's Javelin Throw 
 Otto Ammermann, Herbert Blöcker, Helmut Rethemeier, and Karl Schultz — Equestrian, Three-Day Event Team 
 Alwin Schockemöhle, Paul Schockemöhle, Sönke Sönksen, and Hans-Günter Winkler — Equestrian, Jumping Team 
 Harry Boldt — Equestrian, Dressage Individual 
 Jürgen Hehn — Fencing, Épée Individual 
 Reinhold Behr, Volker Fischer, Jürgen Hehn, Hannes Jana, and Alexander Pusch — Fencing, Épée Team
 Günther Neureuther — Judo, Men's Heavyweight 
 Peter-Michael Kolbe — Rowing, Men's Single Sculls 
 Ulrich Lind — Shooting, Men's Small-bore Rifle prone

Bronze
 Paul-Heinz Wellmann — Athletics, Men's 1500 metres
 Klaus-Peter Hildenbrand — Athletics, Men's 5000 metres
 Bernd Herrmann, Franz-Peter Hofmeister, Lothar Krieg, and Harald Schmid — Athletics, Men's 4 × 400 m Relay
 Inge Helten — Athletics, Women's 100 metres
 Reinhard Skricek — Boxing, Men's Welterweight 
 Karl Schultz — Equestrian, Three-Day Event Individual 
 Reiner Klimke — Equestrian, Dressage Individual 
 Eberhard Gienger — Gymnastics, Men's Horizontal Bar 
 Thomas Strauß and Peter van Roye — Rowing, Men's Coxless Pairs 
 Hans-Johann Färber, Siegfried Fricke, Ralph Kubail, Peter Niehusen, and Hartmut Wenzel — Rowing, Men's Coxed Fours 
 Edith Eckbauer-Baumann and Thea Einöder-Straube — Rowing, Women's Coxless Pairs 
 Werner Seibold — Shooting, Men's Small-bore Rifle Three Positions
 Peter Nocke — Swimming, Men's 100m Freestyle 
 Michael Kraus, Walter Kusch, Peter Nocke, and Klaus Steinbach — Swimming, Men's 4 × 100 m Medley Relay
 Karl-Heinz Helbing — Wrestling, Men's Greco-Roman Welterweight 
 Adolf Seger — Wrestling, Men's Freestyle Middleweight
 Jörg Schmall and Jörg Spengler — Sailing, Men's Tornado

Archery

In their second Olympics competing in archery, West Germany captured seventh place on the national leaderboard with a 6th place in the men's competition and an 8th place in the women's.  In addition to those two competitors, West Germany also sent one other competitor in the men's division.

Women's Individual Competition:
 Maria Urban – 2376 points (→ 8th place)

Men's Individual Competition:
 Willi Gabriel – 2435 points (→ 6th place)
 Rudolf Schiff – 2326 points (→ 27th place)

Athletics

Men's 800 metres
 Willi Wulbeck
 Heat — 1:48.47
 Semi Final — 1:47.18
 Final — 1:45.26 (→ 4th place)

 Thomas Wessinghage
 Heat — 1:46.56
 Semi Final — 1:48.18 (→ did not advance)

Men's 4 × 100 m Relay 
 Klaus Ehl, Klaus-Dieter Bieler, Dieter Steinmann, and  Reinhard Borchert
 Heat — 39.63
 Semi Final — 39.58 (→ did not advance)

Men's 4 × 400 m Relay 
 Franz-Peter Hofmeister, Lothar Krieg, Harald Schmid, and Bernd Herrmann
 Heat — 3:03.24
 Final — 3:01.98 (→  Bronze Medal)

Men's 400m Hurdles
 Harald Schmid
 Heats — 50.57s
 Semi Finals — DSQ (→ did not advance)

Men's Marathon
 Günther Mielke — 2:35:44 (→ 54th place)

Men's Long Jump 
 Hans Baumgartner
 Qualification — 7.81m (→ did not advance)
 Final — 7.84m (→ 8th place)

 Hans-Jürgen Berger
 Qualification — 7.70m (→ did not advance)

Men's High Jump
 Walter Boller
 Qualification — 2.13m (→ did not advance)

 Wolfgang Killing
 Qualification — 2.05m (→ did not advance)

Men's Discus Throw
 Hein-Direck Neu
 Qualification — 61.88m
 Final — 60.46m (→ 12th place)

Men's 20 km Race Walk
 Gerhard Weidner — 1:32:56 (→ 18th place)
 Bernd Kannenberg — did not finish (→ no ranking)

Women's Shot Put
Eva Wilms
Final — 19.29 m (→ 7th place)

Boxing

Men's Flyweight (– 51 kg)
 Joachim Schür 
 First Round — Bye
 Second Round — Lost to Jong Jo-Ung (PRK), RSC-2

Canoeing

Cycling

Twelve cyclists represented West Germany in 1976.

Individual road race
 Klaus-Peter Thaler — 4:47:23 (→ 9th place) 
 Wilfried Trott — 4:49:01 (→ 19th place) 
 Hans-Peter Jakst — 4:49:01 (→ 37th place) 
 Peter Weibel — 4:45:49 (→ 46th place)

Team time trial
 Hans-Peter Jakst
 Olaf Paltian
 Friedrich von Löffelholz
 Peter Weibel

Sprint
 Dieter Berkmann — 4th place

1000m time trial
 Hans Michalsky — 1:07.878 (→ 6th place)

Individual pursuit
 Gregor Braun —  Gold Medal

Team pursuit
 Gregor Braun
 Hans Lutz
 Günther Schumacher
 Peter Vonhof

Diving

Equestrian

Fencing

16 fencers, 11 men and 5 women, represented West Germany in 1976.

Men's foil
 Harald Hein
 Matthias Behr
 Klaus Reichert

Men's team foil
 Thomas Bach, Harald Hein, Klaus Reichert, Matthias Behr, Erk Sens-Gorius

Men's épée
 Alexander Pusch
 Hans-Jürgen Hehn
 Reinhold Behr

Men's team épée
 Hans-Jürgen Hehn, Volker Fischer, Alexander Pusch, Reinhold Behr, Hanns Jana

Men's sabre
 Tycho Weißgerber

Women's foil
 Cornelia Hanisch
 Brigitte Oertel
 Ute Kircheis-Wessel

Women's team foil
 Karin Rutz-Gießelmann, Cornelia Hanisch, Ute Kircheis-Wessel, Brigitte Oertel, Jutta Höhne

Gymnastics

Handball

Hockey

Men's team competition
Preliminary round (group B)
 Tied with New Zealand (1-1)
 Lost to Pakistan (2-4)
 Lost to Spain (1-4)
 Defeated Belgium (6-1)
Classification Matches
 5th/8th place: Defeated India (3-2) 
 5th/6th place: Defeated Spain (9-1) → Fifth place

Team roster
 ( 1.) Wolfgang Rott
 ( 2.) Klaus Ludwiczak
 ( 3.) Michael Peter
 ( 4.) Dieter Freise
 ( 5.) Fritz Schmidt
 ( 6.) Michael Krause
 ( 7.) Horst Dröse
 ( 8.) Werner Kaessmann
 ( 9.) Uli Vos
 (10.) Peter Caninenberg
 (11.) Peter Trump
 (12.) Hans Montag
 (13.) Wolfgang Strödter
 (14.) Heiner Dopp
 (15.) Rainer Seifert
 (16.) Ralf Lauruschkat
Head coach: Klaus Kleiter

Judo

Modern pentathlon

Three male pentathletes represented West Germany in 1976.

Individual
 Walter Esser
 Gerhard Werner
 Wolfgang Köpcke

Team
 Walter Esser
 Gerhard Werner
 Wolfgang Köpcke

Rowing

Sailing

Shooting

Swimming

Water polo

Men's team competition
Team roster
Günter Kilian
Günter Wolf
Hans-Georg Simon
Horst Kilian
Jürgen Stiefel
Ludger Weeke
Martin Jellinghaus
Peter Röhle
Roland Freund
Werner Obschernikat
Wolfgang Mechler

Weightlifting

Wrestling

References

Germany, West
1976
Summer Olympics